Thulium(III) bromide is a crystalline compound of one thulium atom and three bromine atoms. The salt is a white powder at room temperature. It is hygroscopic.

Usage
Thulium(III) bromide is used as a reagent for the complexation of lanthanide bromides with aluminium bromide, and as a reactant for preparing alkali metal thulium bromides. It is also used to create discharge lamps that are free of mercury.

References

Bromides
Thulium compounds
Lanthanide halides